Niphona regisfernandi is a species of beetle in the family Cerambycidae. It was described by Paiva in 1860.

References

regisfernandi
Beetles described in 1860